is a former Japanese footballer.

Career statistics

Club

Notes

References

1992 births
Living people
Japanese footballers
Japanese expatriate footballers
Association football midfielders
Montenegrin First League players
Kategoria Superiore players
Kategoria e Parë players
FK Mogren players
FK Sutjeska Nikšić players
Flamurtari Vlorë players
KS Sopoti Librazhd players
Japanese expatriate sportspeople in Montenegro
Expatriate footballers in Montenegro
Japanese expatriate sportspeople in Albania
Expatriate footballers in Albania